The Nol Card is an electronic ticketing card that was released for all modes of public transport in Dubai services, in August 2009. The word Nol is an Arabic word نول for fare. The Nol Card system was developed by Hong Kong-based company Octopus Cards Limited.

A Nol Card is a credit-card-sized stored-value contactless smartcard that can hold prepaid funds to pay for fares on buses and trains within one or more of four "zones". The credit must be added to the card before travel. Passengers "tag on" and "tag off" their card on electronic gates at the metro station or electronic terminals in buses when entering and leaving the transport system in order to validate it or deduct funds. Initially the Cards can be purchased only from Metro Stations and Bus Terminus only. These prepaid Cards can "topped-up" online, at ticket machines or at ticketing offices by credit, debit card or cash. The card is designed to reduce the number of transactions at ticket offices and the number of paper tickets. Usage is encouraged by offering cheaper fares than the paper ticketed option, although there is a fee to purchase the card. Unlimited one-day trip and monthly passes for the metro is only available with the Nol Red Ticket. The Blue Nol Card offers concessions for students, UAE national senior citizen and the disabled.

The number of daily transactions of Nol cards currently tops 1.5 million transactions; which includes passengers’ entry/exit from Metro and bus stations, payment of parking fees, and recharging of cards. In 2012, RTA produces more than 5 million Nol Cards since the day it was launched (August 2009).

In June 2013, The Nol card was awarded the Best Prepaid Card in the Middle East in the Smart Card Awards Middle East 2013.

Timeline 
In 2013, The Nol card was awarded the Best Prepaid Card in the Middle East in the Smart Card Awards Middle East 2013.
On 26 September 2013, RTA announced the Smart Nol.
On 21 August 2014, RTA increased the minimum balance from AED 1.80 (US$0.49) to AED 7.50 (US$2.04) to avoid journey interruptions.
On 21 August 2014, RTA saw 52% increase on Nol Card sales since January 2014.
On 21 October 2014, RTA announced new subscription package for the Nol Card.
On 6 November 2014, RTA revised the public transport tariff, to take effect on 11 November 2014.

Usage 
The Nol card can be used to pay the fare for travel on the metro, tram, buses and water buses, and for paid parking provided by the Roads and Transport Authority (RTA). The Nol card can also be used on taxis. Currently, only 8000+ taxis including airport taxis accept the Nol card. From mid 2015 onwards, all taxis will be equipped with an upgraded system to accept the Nol card along with Credit/Debit cards.

Types 
There are four different types of cards available:

Special Design
The Roads & Transport Authority (RTA) has made a new edition of the Personalized Blue Nol cards featuring special designs of Dubai landmarks such as Burj Al Arab, Burj Khalifa, Bastakiya, Clock Roundabout, and the Trade Center in a bid to familiarize visitors, as well as residents, with iconic landmarks of the Emirate.

Limited Edition Cards
The Roads & Transport Authority (RTA) launches limited editions cards to mark various occasions and events such as the National Day. The recent limited edition card was themed on Expo 2020.

Smart Nol 
Announced on 26 November 2013, The Roads and Transport Authority (RTA) announced its partnership with Etisalat & du to launch its first ‘Smart Nol’ Service. Smart Nol is similar to Apple Pay and Google Wallet tap and pay, Smart Nol uses NFC enabled smart phones to check-in and check-out of the metro, bus, water bus and metro parking.

Requirements
Smart Nol requires NFC SIM from Etisalat or du and a compatible handset.

See also 
List of smart cards

References

External links
Official website 
Nol Cards Guide 

Transport in Dubai
Contactless smart cards
Fare collection systems